Qiñwani Punta (Aymara qiñwa, qiwña a kind of tree  (polylepis), -ni a suffix, qiñwani "the one with the qiwña tree", also spelled Kheñwani Punta) is a mountain in the Bolivian Andes which reaches a height of approximately . It is located in the Cochabamba Department, Ayopaya Province, Morochata Municipality.

References 

Mountains of Cochabamba Department